Avraham is a masculine given name, the Hebrew version of Abraham. It may refer to:

 Avraham Adan (1926–2012), Israeli major general
 Avraham Avigdorov (1929–2012), Israeli soldier and recipient of the Hero of Israel award (today the Medal of Valor)
 Avraham Ben-Yitzhak (1883–1950), Israeli Hebrew poet
 Avraham Biran (1909–2008), Israeli Archaeologist.
 Avraham Burg (born 1955), Israeli author, politician and businessman
 Avraham Danzig (1748–1820), a Posek and codifier, author of the works of Jewish law Chayei Adam and Chochmat Adam
 Avraham Deutsch (1889–1953), Israeli politician
 Avraham Eilat (born 1939), Israeli artist, educator and curator
 Avraham Even-Shoshan (1906–1984), Russian-born Israeli Hebrew linguist and lexicographer, compiler of the Even-Shoshan dictionary
 Avraham Gombiner (c. 1635–1682), rabbi, Talmudist and religious authority in Poland
 Avraham Granot (1890–1962), Zionist and Israeli politician, a signatory of the Israeli declaration of independence.
 Avraham Grant (born 1955), Israeli football manager.
 Avraham Harman (1914–1992), Israeli diplomat and Hebrew University of Jerusalem president
 Avraham Herzfeld (1891–1973), Zionist activist and Israeli politician
 Avraham Hirschson (born 1941), Israeli former politician convicted of embezzlement
 Avraham Katz (1931–1986), Israeli politician
 Avraham Katznelson (1888–1956), Russian-born Zionist and politician, a signatory of the Israeli declaration of independence
 Avraham Maimuni (1186–1237), son of Maimonides and his successor as Nagid of the Egyptian Jewish community
 Avraham Menchel (born 1935), Israeli former footballer
 Avraham Neguise (born 1958), Israeli politician
 Avraham Nudelman (1910–1985), Israeli footballer
 Avraham Ofek (1935–1990), Israeli sculptor, muralist, painter and printmaker
 Avraham Ofer (1922–1977), Israeli politician who committed suicide over a corruption scandal
 Avraham Oz (born 1944), Israeli associate professor of Theatre and Hebrew and Comparative literature at the University of Haifa, translator and peace activist
 Avraham Palman (1919–2000), Israeli footballer
 Avraham Poraz (born 1945), Israeli lawyer and former politician
 Avraham Ravitz (1934–2009), Israeli politician
 Avraham Sela, Israeli historian and scholar on the Middle East and international relations
 Avraham Shekhterman (1910–1986), Israeli politician
 Avraham Shapira (1914–2007), Israeli rabbi, head of the Rabbinical court of Jerusalem, member and head of the Supreme Rabbinical Court and Ashkenazi Chief Rabbi of Israel
 Avraham Yosef Shapira (1921–2000), Israeli politician and businessman.
 Avraham Duber Kahana Shapiro (1870–1943), last Chief Rabbi of Lithuania.
 Avraham Shlonsky (1900–1973), Israeli poet.
 Avraham Shochat (born 1936), Israeli former politician, twice Minister of Finance.
 Avraham Stern (1907–1942), one of the leaders of the Jewish paramilitary organization Irgun and founder of the breakaway paramilitary group Stern Gang
 Avraham Stern (politician) (1935–1997), Israeli politician
 Avraham Tamir (1924–2010), Israeli major general
 Avraham Trahtman (born 1944), Russian-born Israeli mathematician
 Avraham Tal (born 1976), Israeli singer, musician, and musical producer.
 Avraham Yaski (1927–2014), Israeli architect
 Avraham Yoffe (1913–1983), Israeli general during the Six-Day War and politician
 Avraham Yosef, Chief Rabbi of Holon, Israel, and a Sephardi representative on the Chief Rabbinate Council
 Avraham Zilberberg (1915–1980), Israeli politician

Hebrew masculine given names